Julius Geertz (21 April 1837–21 October 1902) was a German artist of the Düsseldorf school of painting.

Biography
He moved to Düsseldorf in 1860 and entered the studio of Rudolf Jordan. In 1864 he travelled to Paris, where he studied the work of the old masters, and afterwards to Brittany and the Netherlands.

He then settled in Düsseldorf, where he painted genre scenes, partly serious, partly humorous, taken from ordinary life and the doings of young people; among these Der Verbrecher nach der Verurteilung ("The Criminal after the Judgement") established his reputation. He is counted as one of the so-called Düsseldorf School.

His works are distinguished by serious effort to capture the truth to life of individual character, excellent drawing and telling use of colour, as well as a frequent use of subtle humour. He was a member of the Düsseldorf painters' society Malkasten ("paintbox").

Geertz died in Braunschweig.

His son Henry Ludwig Geertz (born 1872 in Düsseldorf; date and place of death unknown) studied from 1889 at the Kunstakademie Düsseldorf with Peter Janssen, and from 1893 in the painting classes of  Julius Roeting and Eduard von Gebhardt. He was a member of the Hamburger Künstlerverein ("Hamburg Artists' Society"). Among his major works is the group portrait of the founding members of the Hamburgische Wissenschaftliche Stiftung ("Hamburg Scientific Society").

Selected works 
 Zerniert und Kapituliert
 Zwei heitere Kinderbilder
 Folgen des Schularrestes
 Der Fliegenfänger
 Die Dorfschule
 Wacht am Rhein
 Kriegsgefangene
 Das Mädchen mit dem Vogelnest
 Der Bettelpfennig

Notes and references

Sources 
 Gitta Ho, 2015: Geertz, Julius in Savoy, Bénédicte und Nerlich, France (ed.): Pariser Lehrjahre. Ein Lexikon zur Ausbildung deutscher Maler in der französischen Hauptstadt. Band 2: 1844–1870.

External links 

Meyers-Konversations-Lexikon (4th edn 1885-92) vol 6: article on Julius Geertz

1837 births
1902 deaths
Artists from Düsseldorf
German genre painters
19th-century German painters
19th-century German male artists
Artists from Hamburg
Düsseldorf school of painting